The Silent Partner is a 1917 American silent drama film directed by Marshall Neilan from a screen story by Edmund Goulding and starred Blanche Sweet, who in a few years would marry Marshall Neilan. The film was remade in 1923, and also released by Paramount Pictures.

Plot summary

Cast
 Blanche Sweet as Jane Colby
 Thomas Meighan as Edward Royle
 Henry Herbert as Harvey Wilson
 Ernest Joy as David Pierce
 Mabel Van Buren as Edith Preston
 Florence Smythe as Mrs. Preston
 Mayme Kelso as Mrs. Wilson

See also
 Blanche Sweet filmography

References

External links
 
 
 

1917 films
1917 drama films
Silent American drama films
American silent feature films
American black-and-white films
Famous Players-Lasky films
Films based on short fiction
Films directed by Marshall Neilan
Paramount Pictures films
1910s American films